Vanity Fair is a 1911 silent film adaptation of William Makepeace Thackeray's novel of the same name. It was one of Vitagraph's first three reel productions, along with A Tale of Two Cities (1911).

Plot

Cast
Vanity Fair reportedly made use of Vitagraph's entire company of stock players. The following cast members are named by The Moving Picture World:

 Helen Gardner as Becky Sharpe
 William V. Ranous as Lord Steyne
 Harry Northrup as Rawdon Crawley
 Alec B. Francis as Pitt Crawley
 John Bunny as Jos Sedley
 Leo Delaney as George Osborne
 Tefft Johnson as Captain Dobbin
 Kate Price as Miss Crawley
 William Shea as Sir Pitt Crawley
 Charles Kent as John Sedley
 B. F. Clinton as Mrs. Sedley
 Rose E. Tapley as Amelia Sedley

Production
The Moving Picture World reported in October 1911 that the film was nearly completed. The film was directed by Charles Kent.

Release and reception
The film was released on December 19, 1911. In contrast to A Tale of Two Cities (1911), all three reels of Vanity Fair were released on the same day.

According to The Moving Picture World, the film "comes nearer to being a flawless adaptation than anything else that has appeared in moving pictures".

The film's screenwriter...

Vitagraph continued making three-reelers based on classic literature throughout the 1910s.

In 1916, The Sun listed Vanity Fair among a group of films that adapted classic literature for the screen.

Notes

References

External links

 
 Vanity Fair at the British Film Institute
 Vanity Fair at Letterboxd
 Vanity Fair at the Silent Film Still Archive

1911 films
American black-and-white films
American silent short films
Films based on Vanity Fair (novel)
Vitagraph Studios films
1910s American films